The 2014 Cuyahoga County executive election took place on November 4, 2014, to elect the County Executive of Cuyahoga County, Ohio. Incumbent Democratic County Executive Ed FitzGerald was eligible to run for reelection, but instead retired in order to run unsuccessfully for governor in the concurrent gubernatorial election.

The Democrats nominated former Speaker of the Ohio House of Representatives Armond Budish, while the Republicans nominated Cuyahoga County Councilman Jack Schron.

Budish defeated Schron 59.52% to 40.48%, and took office on January 1, 2015.

Democratic Primary

Candidates

Nominee
 Armond Budish, former Speaker of the Ohio House of Representatives (2009-2011), Ohio State Representative from District 8 (2007-2014)

Eliminated in primary
 Thomas O'Grady, former mayor of North Olmsted (2005-2009)
 Bob Reid, former Cuyahoga County Sheriff (2009-2013)
 Walter Allen Rogers Jr., professional artist
 Timothy J. Russo, blogger
 Shirley Smith, Ohio State Senator from District 21 (2007-2014)

Declined
 Ed FitzGerald, incumbent County Executive (2011-2014) (ran for governor)
 Jim Rokakis, former Cuyahoga County Treasurer (1997-2013)
Chris Ronayne, president of University Circle Inc. (2005-2021)
Brad Sellers, mayor of Warrensville Heights (2012-present)

Primary results

Republican primary

Candidates

Nominee
 Jack Schron, Cuyahoga County Councilman from District 6

Disqualified
 Tanner Fischbach

Declined
 Tom Patton, Ohio State Senator from District 24 (2008-2016)

Primary results

General election

Results

References

Cuyahoga County executive
Cuyahoga County executive
2014 executive